Jose Edson Barros Silva (born 12 October 1988), known as Edson Cariús,  is a Brazilian professional footballer who plays as a forward for Ferroviário, on loan from Fortaleza.

Professional career
Cariús quit his career as a motorcycle salesman in 2010 to work professionally as a footballer. He spent his early career with amateur clubs in his state Ceará. Cariús made his professional debut with CRB in a 3-1 Campeonato Brasileiro Série B win over on Brasil de Pelotas on 10 September 2019.

Career statistics

Honours
Alto Santo
Campeonato Cearense Série B: 2016

Floresta
Copa Fares Lopes: 2017

Ferroviário
Copa Fares Lopes: 2018
Campeonato Brasileiro Série D: 2018

Fortaleza
Campeonato Cearense: 2020

References

External links
 

1988 births
Living people
Sportspeople from Ceará
Brazilian footballers
Brazilian expatriate footballers
Association football forwards
Campeonato Brasileiro Série A players
Campeonato Brasileiro Série B players
Campeonato Brasileiro Série C players
Campeonato Brasileiro Série D players
Associação Atlética Coruripe players
Ferroviário Atlético Clube (CE) players
Fortaleza Esporte Clube players
Clube de Regatas Brasil players
Clube do Remo players
Al-Jabalain FC players
Saudi First Division League players
Expatriate footballers in Saudi Arabia
Brazilian expatriate sportspeople in Saudi Arabia